Robert Edward Homans (November 8, 1877 – July 28, 1947) was an American actor who entered films in 1923 after a lengthy stage career.

Life and career

Robert Homans was born November 8, 1877, in Malden, Massachusetts. Although he studied medicine for three years after his college graduation, a 1906 newspaper article noted that "the 'stage bee' got into his bonnet and nothing would do but that he become an actor." His Broadway credits include The Blue Bird (1910), The Blue Envelope (1915), Johnny, Get Your Gun (1916) and Like a King (1921).

His screen debut came in Madame Sherry. He appeared in some 400 films between 1917 and 1946. 

On April 18, 1909, Homans married Agnes J. Mellon in San Francisco. Another source gives his wife's name as Agnes Maynard.

Homans died in Los Angeles, California on July 28, 1947, from a heart attack.

Filmography

 Madame Sherry (1917) as Minor Role
 Legally Dead (1923) as Detective Powell
 Dark Stairways (1924) as Detective Quinn
 The Breathless Moment (1924) as 'Dippy' Blake 
 The Bandit Buster (1926) as Romeo
 College Days (1926) as Mr. Gordon
 The Silent Power (1926) as David Webster
 Ride 'em High (1927) as Rufus Allen
 Range Courage (1927) as Pop Gallagher
 The Prairie King (1927) as Jim Gardner
 Pals in Peril (1927) as Sheriff Kipp
 Mountains of Manhattan (1927) as Big Bill Wright
 Fast and Furious (1927) as Doctor
 Coquette (1929) as Court Bailiff (uncredited)
 The Valiant (1929) as Newspaper Printer (uncredited)
 The Isle of Lost Ships (1929) as Mr. Burke
 Born Reckless (1930) as Policeman (uncredited)
 For the Defense (1930) as Lineup Lieutenant (uncredited) 
 Abraham Lincoln (1930) as Senator (uncredited)
 The Public Enemy (1931) as Officer Pat Burke (uncredited)
 The Lightning Flyer (1931) as John Nelson
 The Drums of Jeopardy (1931) as Detective
 The Black Camel (1931) as Chief of Police (uncredited)
 Pack Up Your Troubles (1932) as Detective (uncredited) 
 If I Had a Million (1932) as Detective (uncredited) 
 She Done Him Wrong (1933) as Doheney 
 Hallelujah, I'm a Bum (1933) as Cop (uncredited)
 Mystery of the Wax Museum (1933) as Desk Sergeant (uncredited) 
 Tugboat Annie (1933) as Old Salt on Schooner (uncredited) 
 One Sunday Afternoon (1933) as Officer Charlie Brown (uncredited)
 Blood Money (1933) as Detective Posing as Drunk (uncredited) 
 Lady Killer (1933) as Jailer (uncredited)
 Jimmy the Gent (1934) as Paddy - Irish Cop (uncredited) 
 The Thin Man (1934) as Billy the Detective (uncredited) 
 The Key (1934) as Patrick the Bartender (uncredited)
 The Lemon Drop Kid (1934) as Sheriff (uncredited) 
 The Whole Town's Talking (1935) as Detective (uncredited) 
 The Informer (1935) as Detractor (uncredited) 
 Steamboat Round the Bend (1935) as Race Official (uncredited)
 She Married Her Boss (1935) as Detective (uncredited) 
 Suicide Squad (1935) as Captain Tim O'Connor
 Barbary Coast (1935) as Fogged-in Ship's Captain (uncredited) 
 The Prisoner of Shark Island (1936) as Sergeant (uncredited) 
Her Master's Voice  (1936) as Stationmaster (uncredited)
 Fury (1936) as Incoming Watchman (uncredited) 
 Mary of Scotland (1936) as Jailer (uncredited)
 Charlie Chan at the Race Track (1936) as Judge (uncredited) 
 Come and Get It (1936) as Cookie (uncredited)
 The Plough and the Stars (1936) as Barman 
 Black Legion (1937) as Motorcycle Cop (uncredited) 
 A Star Is Born (1937) as Bailiff (uncredited)
 Parnell (1937) as Irish Cop in New York (uncredited)
 Dead End (1937) as Policeman on Morning Beat (uncredited) 
 Stella Dallas (1937) as Policeman Outside Wedding (uncredited) 
 Gold Is Where You Find It (1938) as Miner Grogan (uncredited) 
 Angels with Dirty Faces (1938) as Policeman (uncredited)
 Stagecoach (1939) as Ed - Editor (uncredited)
 Dodge City (1939) as Mail Clerk (uncredited)
 Union Pacific (1939) as Man (uncredited) 
 Young Mr. Lincoln (1939) as Mr. Clay (uncredited) 
 Scandal Sheet (1939)
 The Oklahoma Kid (1939) as Bartender (uncredited)
 The Saint Strikes Back (1939) as Policer Officer Moriarity (uncredited)
 Swanee River (1939) as Sheriff (uncredited) 
 The Grapes of Wrath (1940) as Spencer 
 Johnny Apollo (1940) as Receptionist Guard (uncredited) 
 Virginia City (1940) as Southerner (uncredited) 
 Beyond Tomorrow (1940) as Sergeant 
 Lillian Russell (1940) as Stage Doorman
 A Dispatch from Reuter's (1940) as Reporter (uncredited)
 A Man Betrayed (1941) as Traffic Policeman (uncredited) 
 Life Begins for Andy Hardy (1941) as Mr. Hood (uncredited)
 Unexpected Uncle (1941) as Police Sergeant (uncredited)
 It Started with Eve (1941) as Railway Conductor (uncredited) 
 The Maltese Falcon (1941) as Policeman (uncredited)
 Unholy Partners (1941) as Insp. Pat Brody (uncredited) 
 Nazi Agent (1942) as 1st Captain (uncredited) 
 Reap the Wild Wind (1942) as Captain in Cafe (uncredited) 
 The Spoilers (1942) as Sea Captain (uncredited) 
  In Old California (1942) as Marshal Alvin Thompson (uncredited) 
 Holiday Inn (1942) as Pop (uncredited)
 Night Monster (1942) as Constable Cap Beggs
 For Me and My Gal (1942) as Palace Doorman (uncredited) 
 I Married a Witch (1942) as Fire Chief (uncredited) 
 No Time for Love (1943) as Pop Murphy (uncredited) 
 Sweet Rosie O'Grady (1943) as Barney
 Jack London (1943) as Captain Allen
 Cover Girl (1944) as Pop - Doorman (uncredited)
 It Happened Tomorrow (1944) as Mulcahey - Policeman (uncredited)
 Buffalo Bill (1944) as Policeman Muldoon (uncredited)
 Pin Up Girl (1944) as Stage Doorman (uncredited)
 The Adventures of Mark Twain (1944) as Policeman (uncredited)
 Make Your Own Bed (1944) as Policeman (uncredited)
 Christmas Holiday (1944) as Policeman (uncredited)
 Nothing But Trouble (1944) as Jailer (uncredited)
 Can't Help Singing (1944) as Albert (uncredited) 
 Louisiana Hayride (1944) as Police Officer Conlon
 The Thin Man Goes Home (1945) as Railroad Clerk (uncredited)
 The Clock (1945) as Blood Test Official (uncredited)
 A Medal for Benny (1945) as Police Chief (uncredited)
 The Scarlet Clue (1945) as Capt. Flynn
 They Were Expendable (1945) as Bartender (uncredited)
 Anchors Aweigh (1945) as Old Cop (uncredited)
 Because of Him (1946) as Police Sergeant (uncredited) 
 Cluny Brown (1946) as New York Policeman (uncredited) 
 The Strange Love of Martha Ivers (1946) as Gallagher (uncredited)
 No Leave, No Love (1946) as Railroad Ticket-Taker (uncredited)

References

External links

1877 births
1947 deaths
American male stage actors
American male film actors
American male silent film actors
People from Malden, Massachusetts
20th-century American male actors